Paul R. Renne (born 1957 in San Antonio, Texas) is the director of the Berkeley Geochronology Center and also Professor in Residence of geology in the Department of Earth & Planetary Science, University of California, Berkeley (UC Berkeley). Renne is considered a leading expert on the argon–argon dating technique and is interested in paleomagnetism in Earth history, precisely dating flood basalts, particularly the Siberian Traps, and large igneous province volcanism in general, and paleoanthropology. Renne received his A.B. and his Ph.D. in geology from UC Berkeley.

References

Radiometric dating
Living people
1957 births
People from San Antonio
American geologists
University of California, Berkeley alumni
University of California, Berkeley faculty